CLASS may refer to:

Organizations
 Canadian Light Aircraft Sales and Service, a Canadian aircraft manufacturer
 Class (warez), a group from 1997 to 2004
 College of Liberal Arts and Social Sciences, an academic college at the University of Houston, US
 Centre for Labour and Social Studies, chaired by Laura Pidcock

Science and technology
 Canadian Land Surface Scheme, for use in large scale climate models
 Cosmology Large Angular Scale Surveyor, an experiment to measure the polarization of the cosmic microwave background
 Custom Local Area Signaling Services, which describes telephony terms e.g. call waiting, caller ID

Other

 Consular Lookout and Support System, a system supporting the U.S. Department of State's Bureau of Consular Affairs

See also
 Class (disambiguation)